Buckaroo Blues is a collection of early recordings of songs by American art rock band the Residents that the band performed on their Cube-E tour.  The songs are interpretations of Western folk songs and cowboy poems.  The album also includes outtakes of songs that were to be played on the abandoned God in 3 Persons tour.

The album was available only to members of the Residents' fan club, UWEB.

Track listing
 Buckaroo Blues
 Theme from Buckaroo Blues
 Stampede
 Trail Dance
 Bury Me Not
 Cowboy Waltz
 Saddle Sores
 Theme from Buckaroo Blues (Reprise)
 Land of a Thousand Dances/Double Shot
 God in Three Persons' Over

References

The Residents albums
1988 albums